Meziane Dahmani (born 2 February 1965) is an Algerian judoka. He competed at the 1988 Summer Olympics and the 1992 Summer Olympics.

References

External links
 

1965 births
Living people
Algerian male judoka
Olympic judoka of Algeria
Judoka at the 1988 Summer Olympics
Judoka at the 1992 Summer Olympics
Place of birth missing (living people)
20th-century Algerian people
African Games medalists in judo
Competitors at the 1987 All-Africa Games
Competitors at the 1995 All-Africa Games
African Games gold medalists for Algeria
African Games bronze medalists for Algeria